Ban Zelan-e Sofla (also Romanized as Bān Zelān-e Soflá) is a village in Gurani Rural District, Gahvareh District, Dalahu County, Kermanshah Province, Iran. At the 2006 census, its population was 48, in 11 families.

References 

Populated places in Dalahu County